Robert Laliberté (born 1951) is a Canadian photographer, best known for his male nudes. Originally from Quebec City, Quebec, he has lived and worked in Montreal since 1975.

Work
His photographs of male nudes, evoking the works of Herb Ritts and Robert Mapplethorpe, made him known in Canada and abroad. He is considered the "flagship photographer " of the gay community of Montreal and a major player in the emergence of gay culture in Montreal. He was the official photographer of the magazine Fugues for twelve years (1984–1996).

Laliberté also worked as a photographer in the theater and explored other themes, such as street scenes or portraits of old people.

Exhibitions and awards
Laliberté presented his work in over 20 exhibitions and several publications in Canada and abroad. He was awarded the prix Arc-en-ciel pour la culture in 2002. That same year, the Ecomuseum du fier monde (Montreal) devoted a retrospective of his career.

A portrait of Laliberté by artist Zilon is held by The ArQuives: Canada's LGBTQ2+ Archives' National Portrait Collection, in honour of Laliberté's role as a significant builder of LGBT culture and history in Canada. Laliberté was also the portrait artist for another inductee in the same collection, writer and artist Jovette Marchessault.

References

1951 births
Living people
Artists from Quebec City
Canadian photographers
Canadian gay artists
Canadian LGBT photographers
Gay photographers
French Quebecers